György Kapocsi (20 December 1922 – 25 January 1999) was a Hungarian boxer. He competed in the men's light heavyweight event at the 1948 Summer Olympics. At the 1948 Summer Olympics, he lost to Don Scott of Great Britain.

References

External links
 

1922 births
1999 deaths
Hungarian male boxers
Olympic boxers of Hungary
Boxers at the 1948 Summer Olympics
Sportspeople from Somogy County
Light-heavyweight boxers